Cloyd William Webb (February 13, 1942 – March 15, 1991) was a Canadian football player who played for the Hamilton Tiger-Cats and Winnipeg Blue Bombers. He won the Grey Cup with the Tiger-Cats in 1965. He played college football at the University of Iowa. Webb was drafted by the Chicago Bears in the 13th round of the 1964 NFL Draft, but did not play in the league.

References

1942 births
1991 deaths
Sportspeople from East St. Louis, Illinois
Players of American football from Illinois
Iowa Hawkeyes football players
Hamilton Tiger-Cats players